Geoffrey, Geoffroy, Geoff, etc., may refer to:

People
 Geoffrey (name), including a list of people with the name
 Geoffroy (surname), including a list of people with the name
 Geoffrey of Monmouth (c. 1095–c. 1155), clergyman and one of the major figures in the development of British history
 Geoffrey I of Anjou (died 987)
 Geoffrey II of Anjou (died 1060)
 Geoffrey III of Anjou (died 1096)
 Geoffrey IV of Anjou (died 1106)
 Geoffrey V, Count of Anjou (1113–1151), father of King Henry II of England
 Geoffrey II, Duke of Brittany (1158–1186), one of Henry II's sons
 Geoffrey, Archbishop of York (c. 1152–1212)
 Geoffroy du Breuil of Vigeois, 12th century French chronicler
 Geoffroy de Charney (died 1314), Preceptor of the Knights Templar
 Geoffroy IV de la Tour Landry (c. 1320–1391), French nobleman and writer
 Geoffrey the Baker (died c. 1360), English historian and chronicler
 Geoffroy (musician) (born 1987), Canadian singer, songwriter and multi-instrumentalist

Fictional characters 
 Geoffrey the Giraffe, the Toys "R" Us mascot
 Geoff, a character from the cartoon series Total Drama
 Geoff, Mark Corrigon's romantic rival on Peep Show

Other uses
 Geoff (Greyhawk), a fictional land in the World of Greyhawk Dungeons & Dragons campaign setting

See also 
 Galfrid
 Geof
 Gofraid/Goraidh
 Godfrey (name)
 Gottfried
 Godefroy (disambiguation)
 Goffredo
 Jeffery (name)
 Jeffrey (name)
 Jeffries
 Jeffreys
 Jeffers
 Jeoffry (cat)
 Jeff